Maligatenna is a village in Sri Lanka. It is located within Yatawatta Divisional Secretariat, Matale District, Central Province, Sri Lanka.

See also
List of settlements in Central Province (Sri Lanka)

External links

Populated places in Matale District